Woodbury is a small township in the Canterbury Region in the South Island of New Zealand. The township is home to various small local businesses.

History 
The early history of Woodbury is centred around the timber industry and farming. The town was first established by Robert Taylor and Frederick Flatman in 1866 as a saw milling and farming settlement.  The town enjoyed rapid growth in its early years and was home to a large general store, two butchers shops, a shoemaker, a creamery, a blacksmith and a two-storeyed wooden hotel, that would later blow down in a gale.

The settlement was originally known as Waihi Bush, however, was renamed Woodbury after the birthplace Elizabeth Flatman (Frederick Flatman's wife) in Gloucestershire, England.

Demographics
The settlement is part of the larger Arundel statistical area. 

Woodbury had a population of 105 at the 2018 New Zealand census, an increase of 9 people (9.4%) since the 2013 census, and an increase of 9 people (9.4%) since the 2006 census. There were 48 households. There were 57 males and 51 females, giving a sex ratio of 1.12 males per female. The median age was 56.5 years (compared with 37.4 years nationally), with 15 people (14.3%) aged under 15 years, 6 (5.7%) aged 15 to 29, 60 (57.1%) aged 30 to 64, and 27 (25.7%) aged 65 or older.

Ethnicities were 91.4% European/Pākehā, 2.9% Pacific peoples, 5.7% Asian, and 5.7% other ethnicities (totals add to more than 100% since people could identify with multiple ethnicities).

Although some people objected to giving their religion, 51.4% had no religion, and 45.7% were Christian.

Of those at least 15 years old, 21 (23.3%) people had a bachelor or higher degree, and 9 (10.0%) people had no formal qualifications. The median income was $34,600, compared with $31,800 nationally. The employment status of those at least 15 was that 42 (46.7%) people were employed full-time, 18 (20.0%) were part-time, and 3 (3.3%) were unemployed.

Education 
The original Waihi Bush school was opened in 1872,  the school would later be moved to its current location and renamed in 1881.  Woodbury school continues to operate today as a four teacher contributing primary school serving years 1 to 6, with a roll of  students as of   The school's principal is  Mike De Joux.

Buildings

Eleanor Tripp Library 
A small wooden library built as a memorial to Eleanor Tripp is still run by locals today and doubles as a museum.  Outside the library is the area War Memorial.

St Thomas's Church 
The original wooden church was consecrated in 1879, however population growth in the region ensured that a new, larger church was needed.  The church was rebuilt by Oswald Scott and Bert Cooling using Norman styling and stones from the local river, it was completed in 1938.  The interior of the church features stained glass windows made by Veronica Whall, Joseph Nuttgens and Stephen Bélanger-Taylor as well as carving by Frederick Gurnsey.  The church is still used today for services and is a popular wedding location.

Woodbury Domain 
Land was reserved for the domain in 1883 and the Woodbury Hall was built in 1911 in celebration of the coronation of King George V. The domain consists of a cricket pavilion, tennis courts, children's playground, public toilets and BBQ.  Adjacent to the domain is the cemetery that has been used since 1879.

Notable residents 
 Esther Studholme Hope (née Baker, 1885–1975), New Zealand painter

References

External links 
 Woodbury School

Timaru District
Populated places in Canterbury, New Zealand